Ipswich Corporation Tramways was an electric tramway system that served the town of Ipswich in Suffolk from 23 November 1903 until 26 July 1926.

Infrastructure

Horse tramway

Electric tramway
In 1903 the electric tramway replaced the horse tramway. Extensions to the system increased track length to  producing a network that centred upon Cornhill. From Cornhill the lines ran along:

 Westgate Street, St Matthew Street, Barracks Corner, Mill Street, Portman Road to junction with Princes Street. Spur along Portman's Walk to the depot at Constantine Road.
 Westgate Street, St Matthew Street, Barracks Corner, Norwich Road, Bramford Road to a terminus just east of the railway line at 
 Princes Street to a terminus at (Ipswich railway station).

The depot, consisting of a power station and tram shed, was in Constantine Road. The buildings are still in use by motorbuses.

Tramcars
The fleet, in a livery of dark green and cream, consisted of:
 36 Brush open top double deck tramcars.

Closure
Line closures started in 1923 and were completed in 1926. Five of the tramcars and one tramcar body were sold to Scarborough Tramways Company. The tramway system was replaced by a trolleybus system.

References

External links
 The engine room in Ipswich Tram Depot
 Tramcar No 33 at Ipswich Transport Museum
 Ipswich Corporation Tramways button
 Ipswich Corporation Tramways uniformed staff

See also
List of town tramway systems in the United Kingdom

Tram transport in England
Tramways
3 ft 6 in gauge railways in England